Margaret Evelyn Lenny "Maggie" Simpson
is a fictional character in the animated television series The Simpsons and a part of the Simpson family, notably the youngest member. She first appeared on television in the Tracey Ullman Show short "Good Night" on April 19, 1987. Maggie was created and designed by cartoonist Matt Groening while he was waiting in the lobby of James L. Brooks' office. She received her first name from Groening's youngest sister. After appearing on The Tracey Ullman Show for three years, the Simpson family was given their own series on the Fox Broadcasting Company which debuted December 17, 1989.

Maggie is the youngest child of Homer and Marge, and the younger sister to Bart and Lisa. She is often seen sucking on her orange pacifier and, when she walks, she trips over her clothing and falls on her face (this running gag is used much more in earlier seasons). Being an infant, she has not yet learned how to talk. However, she did appear to talk in the first Tracey Ullman Show short.

Though she rarely talks, she frequently makes a characteristic sucking noise with her pacifier, which has become synonymous with the character. Her pacifier sucking noises are provided by the show's creator, Matt Groening, and early producer Gábor Csupó. Maggie's occasional speaking parts and other vocalizations are currently provided by Nancy Cartwright, but she has also been voiced by guest stars Carol Kane, James Earl Jones, Elizabeth Taylor and Jodie Foster, and by series regulars Yeardley Smith and Harry Shearer. Maggie has appeared in various media relating to The Simpsons – including video games, The Simpsons Movie, The Simpsons Ride, commercials and comic books – and has inspired an entire line of merchandise.

Role in The Simpsons
The Simpsons uses a floating timeline in which the characters do not physically age, and as such the show is assumed to be set in the current year. In several episodes, events have been linked to specific times, though sometimes this timeline has been contradicted in subsequent episodes. Maggie is the youngest child of Marge and Homer, and sister to Bart and Lisa. When Marge became pregnant with Bart, she and Homer got married at a chapel in Las Vegas. To support his impending family, Homer all but demanded a job at the Springfield Nuclear Power Plant, impressing its owner, Mr. Burns with his aggressive submissiveness. When Marge became pregnant with Lisa, two years later, she and Homer bought their first house. Another six years later, Homer felt financially secure enough to finally quit his job at the Power Plant and take his dream job at Barney's Bowlarama. However, Marge became pregnant with Maggie, so Homer, once again unable to support his family, was forced to reapply for his old job. By the time Maggie was born, Homer had shown great signs of distress, but he managed to find motivation in the form of his newborn baby girl.

During the earlier seasons of the show, Maggie's equivalent of a hallmark was to trip over her clothing and fall on her face while trying to walk, causing a loud thud on the floor, but this was toned down in the later seasons. She has a penchant for her pacifier, on which she is always seen sucking.

Maggie has performed a number of feats that for her age suggest she is highly intelligent, akin to her sister, and possibly a genius. She has spelled out E=MC² with her baby blocks, driven Homer's car, escaped from the Springfield daycare center, written her name on an Etch A Sketch, played Internet poker, spelled words with her baby blocks, shot Mr. Burns, played Lisa's saxophone, and treated her pacifier like a cigarette. However, the rest of the Simpsons family are unaware of Maggie's maturity and Marge carries Maggie wherever they go rather than letting her walk by herself. Maggie is keenly aware of her surroundings, and can usually be seen imitating the flow of action around her. She shows a high degree of dexterity, and she once hit Homer on the head with a mallet and shot a dart at a photograph of him in imitation of Itchy and Scratchy. Despite her age, Maggie is a formidable marksman, as seen in "Who Shot Mr. Burns?" where she shoots Mr. Burns with a handgun that falls into her hands, though whether or not it was intentional is not clear, and in a deliberate manner during "Poppa's Got a Brand New Badge" where she is able to non-fatally shoot a group of mobsters in rapid succession with a rifle that she apparently hides in her crib. Homer had previously left a rifle in her crib in "Mom and Pop Art". It is unclear whether the gun Maggie uses to shoot the mobsters is the same one.

Maggie is usually frightened and exasperated by Homer's attempts to bond with her, but has on several occasions stepped in to save Homer's life: once from drowning, once from being shot by mobsters, once from being kidnapped by a tow truck driver, and once from being shot by Russ Cargill, head of the United States Environmental Protection Agency.

History

Character

Creation

Matt Groening first conceived Maggie and the rest of the Simpson family in 1986 in the lobby of James L. Brooks's office. Groening had been called in to pitch a series of animated shorts for The Tracey Ullman Show, and had intended to present an adaptation of his Life in Hell comic strip. When he realized that animating Life in Hell would require him to rescind publication rights for his life's work, Groening decided to go in another direction, and hurriedly sketched out his version of a dysfunctional family and named the characters after members of his own family. The baby of the family was named Maggie after Groening's youngest sister. Maggie then made her debut with the rest of the Simpsons family on April 19, 1987, in the short "Good Night". In 1989, the shorts were adapted into The Simpsons, a half-hour series that would air on the Fox Broadcasting Company. Maggie and the rest of the family remained the main characters on this new show.

The entire Simpson family was designed so that they would be recognizable in silhouette. The family was crudely drawn, because Groening had submitted basic sketches to the animators, assuming they would clean them up; instead, they just traced over his drawings. Maggie's physical features are generally not used in other characters; for example, in the later seasons, no character other than Lisa shares her hairline. While designing Maggie and Lisa, Groening "couldn't be bothered to even think about girls' hair styles". At the time, Groening was primarily drawing in black and white and when designing Lisa and Maggie, he "just gave them this kind of spiky starfish hair style, not thinking that they would eventually be drawn in color".

Groening thought that it would be funny to have a baby character that did not talk and never grew up, but was scripted to show any emotions that the scene required. Maggie's comedic hallmarks include her tendency to stumble and land on her face while attempting to walk, and a penchant for sucking on her pacifier, the sound of which has become the equivalent of her catchphrase and was originally created by Groening during the Tracey Ullman period. In the early seasons of the show, Maggie would suck her pacifier over other characters' dialogue, but this was discontinued because the producers found it too distracting.

Voice

With few exceptions, Maggie never speaks but participates in the events around her, emoting with subtle gestures and facial expressions. Maggie's first lines were spoken in "Good Night", the first short to air on The Tracey Ullman Show, after the family falls asleep. On this occasion, Liz Georges provided the voice of Maggie.

Rather than talking, Maggie is well known for producing a characteristic "sucking" sound from her pacifier. This sound effect was originally provided by the show's creator Matt Groening, for early episodes of The Tracey Ullman Show, and also by Gabor Csupo (who was also the animation executive producer, for the first 60 episodes). The sucking noise is heard in all of Maggie's appearances to date, and is usually archive audio from either of Groening or Csupo's initial recordings (from the show's early episodes). Other than her sucking noise, Maggie has been known to make other noises, such as occasional squeals and babbling. In most instances, these vocalisations are provided by either Nancy Cartwright or Yeardley Smith.

Although she had previously spoken in fantasies and dream sequences, such as in "Bart vs. Thanksgiving", in which she was voiced by an uncredited Carol Kane, Maggie's first word spoken in the normal continuity of the series occurred in "Lisa's First Word", when she was voiced by Elizabeth Taylor. Although it was only one word ("Daddy"), Taylor had to record the part numerous times before the producers were satisfied. James Earl Jones voiced Maggie in "Treehouse of Horror V". Maggie would later have brief dialogue in "Treehouse of Horror IX", voiced by Harry Shearer, who used his Kang voice. In earlier episodes, Yeardley Smith did many of Maggie's squeaks, cries, laughs and occasional speaking parts, although in the later seasons her parts are done by Nancy Cartwright (including a single word spoken during the end credits of The Simpsons Movie). Jodie Foster voiced a Howard Roark-inspired Maggie in the season 20 episode "Four Great Women and a Manicure".

Reception

Maggie has received both popular and critical acclaim. Nancy Basile at About.com said her favorite Maggie scenes on The Simpsons are the ones that show her acting more like an adult than a one-year-old. Some of her favorite Maggie scenes include scenes from "Sweet Seymour Skinner's Baadasssss Song" and "Lady Bouvier's Lover" where Maggie meets her unibrowed archenemy, Baby Gerald, and the one scene from "Itchy & Scratchy: The Movie" in which Bart is supposed to babysit Maggie, but she escapes and takes Homer's car for a ride. Basile also added that "whether watching 'The Happy Elves' or falling down, Maggie is the cutest baby in the Simpson family". Comedian Ricky Gervais named "And Maggie Makes Three" his second favorite episode of the show and said that the scene in the end where Homer puts up pictures of Maggie over his desk gave him "a lump in the throat thinking about it". Todd Everett at Variety called the scene in "Lisa's First Word" where Maggie speaks her first word "quite a heart-melter".

In 2006, Elizabeth Taylor was named thirteenth on IGN's "Top 25 Simpsons Guest Appearances" list for her performance as Maggie in "Lisa's First Word". James Earl Jones, voice of Maggie in "Treehouse of Horror V", was named the seventh greatest guest star on the show in the same list. In 2000, Maggie and the rest of the Simpson family were awarded a star on the Hollywood Walk of Fame located at 7021 Hollywood Boulevard.

Merchandising
Four children's books, written by Maggie Groening (after whom Maggie was named) and illustrated by Matt Groening, entitled Maggie Simpson's Book of Animals, Maggie Simpson's Counting Book, Maggie Simpson's Book of Colors and Shapes and Maggie Simpson's Alphabet Book were released on September 12, 1991. Other merchandise includes dolls, posters, figurines, jigsaw puzzles, and T-shirts. Maggie was made into an action figure as part of the World of Springfield toy line, and was released in the wave one playset "Living Room", featuring her and Marge in the living room of the Simpsons house. Maggie has appeared in commercials for Burger King, Butterfinger, C.C. Lemon, Domino's Pizza, Ramada Inn and Subway.

Maggie has appeared in other media relating to The Simpsons. She is a character in every one of The Simpsons video games, including the most recent, The Simpsons Game. Alongside the television series, Maggie regularly appeared in issues of Simpsons comics, which were published from 1993 until 2018. Maggie also plays a role in The Simpsons Ride, launched in 2008 at Universal Studios Florida and Hollywood. Maggie starred in the 3D short-film The Longest Daycare, which was shown in theaters before Ice Age: Continental Drift in 2012.

On April 9, 2009, the United States Postal Service unveiled a series of five 44-cent stamps featuring Maggie and the four other members of the Simpson family. They are the first characters from a television series to receive this recognition while the show is still in production. The stamps, designed by Matt Groening, were made available for purchase on May 7, 2009. In a USPS poll, Maggie's stamp was voted the most popular of the five.

Maggie also starred in the 3D short-film Playdate with Destiny, which was shown in theaters before Onward in 2020.

References

Bibliography

External links
 Maggie Simpson on IMDb

The Simpsons characters
Television characters introduced in 1987
Child characters in television
Child characters in animated films
Comedy film characters
Animated human characters
Female characters in animated series
Female characters in film
Fictional infants
Characters created by Matt Groening

de:Die Simpsons (Familie)#Maggie Simpson